Shadow Image is a crime novel by the American writer Martin J. Smith (1956-) set in Pittsburgh, Pennsylvania.

It tells the story of psychologist Jim Christensen's work with Alzheimer's patients and his studies in repressed memory. Now, his most famous patient, the grand matriarch of a powerful political family, has injured herself in a fall. As Christensen studies his patient's art therapy paintings, he unveils a secret locked within the woman's mind that could destroy her family's political ambitions.

Sources
Contemporary Authors Online. The Gale Group, 2006. PEN (Permanent Entry Number):  0000132047.

External links
  Martin J. Smith website

1998 American novels
American crime novels
Novels set in Pittsburgh
Berkley Books books